Sint-Stevens-Woluwe (Woluwe-Saint-Étienne in French) is a town in the Belgian province of Flemish Brabant and is part of Zaventem municipality. The town is located near the Brussels-Capital Region.

See also
Woluwe River, the river flowing through the town.
Woluwe-Saint-Pierre (Sint-Pieters-Woluwe), a nearby municipality.
Woluwe-Saint-Lambert (Sint-Lambrechts-Woluwe), an adjacent municipality.

References

Populated places in Flemish Brabant
Zaventem